The Marsi were an Italic people of  ancient Italy, whose chief centre was Marruvium, on the eastern shore of Lake Fucinus (which was drained for agricultural land in the late 19th century). The area in which they lived is now called Marsica. During the Roman Republic, the people of the region spoke a language now termed Marsian in scholarly English. It is attested by several inscriptions and a few glosses. The LINGUIST List classifies it as one of the Umbrian Group of languages.

Language

Corpus
The Marsian inscriptions are dated by the style of the alphabet from about 300 to 150 BC (the middle Roman Republic). Conway lists nine inscriptions, one from Ortona and two each from Marruvium, Lecce, Trasacco and Luco. In addition, there are a few glosses, a few place names and a few dozen personal names in Latin form.

Phonology
In final syllables, the diphthongs ai, ei, and oi all appear as e. On the other hand, the older form of the name of the tribe (dat. plur.  = Lat. ) shows its derivation and exhibits the assibilation of -tio- into -tso-, proper to the Oscan language but strange to classical Latin.

Bronze of Lake Fucinus

The Bronze of Lake Fucinus was an inscribed bronze plaque taken from the bed of the lake near Luco in 1877 during the process of totally draining the lake. It was in a settlement that had been covered by the lake. The bronze was placed in the Museum of Prince Alessandro Torlonia, where it was photographed for publication. It was lost in 1894, no one could find it nor has it been seen since. The text of the photograph is as follows:
 |  | | 
 |  |  |  | 
 | .

It seems to be or describe a votive offering to the local goddess(es) Anctia (on which, see below) on behalf of the Marsian Legions (pro le[gio]nibus martses), perhaps of boars, but much of the rest is uncertain.

History
They are first mentioned as members of a confederacy with the Vestini, Paeligni and Marrucini. They joined the Samnites in 308 BC, and, on their submission, became allies of Rome in 304 BC. After a short-lived revolt two years later, for which they were punished by the loss of territory, they were readmitted to the Roman alliance and remained faithful down to the Social War, their contingent being always regarded as the flower of the Italian forces. In this war, which, owing to the prominence of the Marsian rebels, is often known as the Marsic War, they fought bravely against odds under their leader Q. Pompaedius Silo, and, though they were frequently defeated, the result of the war was the enfranchisement of the allies.

The Latin colony of Alba Fucens near the northwest corner of the lake was founded in the adjoining Aequian territory in 303, so that, from the beginning of the 3rd century, the Marsians were in touch with a Latin-speaking community, to say nothing of the Latin colony of Carsioli (298 BC) farther west. The earliest pure Latin inscriptions of the district seem to be C.I.L. ix. 3827 and 3848 from the neighbourhood of Supinum; its character generally is of the Gracchan period, though it might be somewhat earlier.

Mommsen pointed out that, in the Social War, all the coins of Pompaedius Silo have the Latin legend "Italia", while the other leaders in all but one case used Oscan.

Religion
The chief temple and grove of the goddess Angitia stood at the southwest corner of Lake Fucinus, near the inlet to the emissarius of Claudius (restored by Prince Torlonia) and the village of Luco dei Marsi. She (or they, for the name is in the plural in the Latin inscription next cited) was widely worshipped in the central highlands as a goddess of healing, especially skilled to cure serpent bites by charms and the herbs of the Marsian woods, which was carried out by local inhabitants until modern times. Their country was considered by Rome to be the home of witchcraft.

See also
 Marsus (disambiguation), Latinisation of the name Marsi
 Umbrian language

References

Bibliography

Attribution
 Endnote:
 (from which some portions of this article are taken; on the Fucino-Bronze, ib. p. 294)

 
Socii
Ancient Abruzzo
Marsica